Fraunces Tavern is a museum and restaurant in New York City, situated at 54 Pearl Street at the corner of Broad Street in the Financial District of Lower Manhattan. The location played a prominent role in history before, during, and after the American Revolution. At various points in its history, Fraunces Tavern served as a headquarters for George Washington, a venue for peace negotiations with the British, and housing federal offices in the Early Republic.

Fraunces Tavern has been owned since 1904 by Sons of the Revolution in the State of New York Inc., which carried out a major conjectural reconstruction, and claim it is Manhattan's oldest surviving building. The museum interprets the building and its history, along with varied exhibitions of art and artifacts. The tavern is a tourist site and a part of the American Whiskey Trail and the New York Freedom Trail. It is listed on the National Register of Historic Places and is a New York City designated landmark. In addition, the block on which Fraunces Tavern is located is a National Historic Landmark District and a New York City designated landmark district.

Early history

Pre-Revolutionary history
New York Mayor Stephanus van Cortlandt built his home in 1671 on the site, but retired to his manor on the Hudson River and gave the property in 1700 to his son-in-law, Étienne "Stephen" DeLancey, a French Huguenot who had married Van Cortlandt's daughter, Anne. The DeLancey family contended with the Livingston family for leadership of the Province of New York.

DeLancey built the current building as a house in 1719. The small yellow bricks used in its construction were imported from the Dutch Republic and the sizable mansion ranked highly in the province for its quality. His heirs sold the building in 1762 to Samuel Fraunces who converted the home into the popular tavern, first named the Queen's Head.  Peridically known as Boltons Tavern or The Coffee house.

Before the American Revolution, the building was one of the meeting places of the secret society, the Sons of Liberty. During the tea crisis caused by the British Parliament's passage of the Tea Act 1773, the patriots forced a British naval captain who tried to bring tea to New York to give a public apology at the building. The patriots, disguised as American Indians (like those of the Boston Tea Party), then dumped the ship's tea cargo into New York Harbor.

In 1768, the New York Chamber of Commerce was founded by a meeting in the building.

On June 13, 1771, King George III of Great Britain granted a royal charter to establish "The Society of the New York Hospital in the City of New York in America" and a Board of Governors for the "reception of such patients as require medical treatment, chirurgical management and maniacs." The first regular meeting of the Board of Governors of what is now known as NewYork-Presbyterian Hospital was held at Fraunces Tavern on July 24, 1771.

Revolution
In August 1775, Americans, principally the 'Hearts of Oak' – a student militia of Kings College, of which Alexander Hamilton was a member – took possession of cannons from the artillery battery at the southern point of Manhattan and fired on HMS Asia. The British Royal Navy ship retaliated by firing a 32-gun broadside on the city, sending a cannonball through the roof of the building.

When the war was all but won, the building was the site of "British-American Board of Inquiry" meetings, which negotiated to ensure to American leaders that no "American property" (meaning former slaves who were emancipated by the British for their military service) be allowed to leave with British troops. Led by Brigadier General Samuel Birch, board members reviewed the evidence and testimonies that were given by freed slaves every Wednesday from April to November 1783, and British representatives were successful in ensuring that almost all of the loyalist blacks of New York maintained their liberty and could be evacuated with the "Redcoats" when they left if so desired. Through this process, Birch created the Book of Negroes.

Washington's farewell to his officers

A week after British troops had evacuated New York on November 25, 1783, the tavern hosted an elaborate "turtle feast" dinner, on December 4, 1783, in the building's Long Room for U.S. Gen. George Washington during which he bade farewell to his officers of the Continental Army by saying "[w]ith a heart full of love and gratitude, I now take leave of you. I most devoutly wish that your latter days may be as prosperous and happy as your former ones have been glorious and honorable." After his farewell, he took each one of his officers by the hand for a personal word.

Post-Revolution
In January 1785, New York City became the seat of the Confederation Congress, the nation's central government under the "Articles of Confederation and Perpetual Union." The departments of Foreign Affairs, Finance and War had their offices at Fraunces Tavern.

With the ratification of the United States Constitution in March 1789, the Confederation Congress's departments became federal departments, and New York City became the first official national capital. The inauguration of George Washington as first President of the United States took place in April 1789. Under the July 1789 Residence Act, Congress moved the national capital to Philadelphia, Pennsylvania for a 10-year period, while the permanent national capital was under construction in what is now Washington, D.C. The federal departments vacated their offices in the building and moved to Philadelphia in 1790.

19th and 20th centuries

The building operated throughout much of the 19th century, but suffered several serious fires beginning in 1832. Having been rebuilt several times, the structure's appearance was changed to the extent that the original building design is not known.  The building was owned by Malvina Keteltas in the early 1800s.  Ernst Buermeyer and his family leased part of the property in 1845 and ran a hotel called the Broad Street House at this location until 1860.  After a disastrous fire in 1852, two stories were added, making the Tavern a total of five stories high. In 1890, the taproom was lowered to street level and the first floor exterior was remodeled, and its original timbers sold as souvenirs. The Manhattan local society of the National Society of the Children of the American Revolution is located at Fraunces Tavern. As of 2020, the Senior Society President is Ms. Elsye Richardson.

Restoration 

In 1900, the tavern was slated for demolition by its owners, who reportedly wanted to use the land for a parking lot. A number of organizations, most notably the Daughters of the American Revolution, worked to preserve it, and convinced New York state government leaders to use their power of eminent domain and designate the building as a park (which was the only clause of the municipal ordinances that could be used for protection, as laws were not envisioned at the time for the subject of "historic preservation", then in its infancy). The temporary designation was later rescinded when the property was acquired in 1904 by the Sons of the Revolution In the State of New York Inc., primarily with funds willed by Frederick Samuel Tallmadge, the grandson of Benjamin Tallmadge, George Washington's chief of intelligence during the Revolution (a plaque depicting Tallmadge is affixed to the building). An extensive reconstruction was completed in 1907 under the supervision of early historic preservation architect, William Mersereau.
A guide book of the era called the tavern "the most famous building in New York".

Historian Randall Gabrielan wrote in 2000 that "Mersereau claimed his remodeling of Fraunces Tavern was faithful to the original, but the design was controversial in his time. There was no argument over removing the upper stories, which were known to have been added during the building's 19th Century commercial use, but adding the hipped roof was questioned. He used the Philipse Manor House in Yonkers, New York as a style guide and claimed to follow the roof line of the original, as found during construction, traced on the bricks of an adjoining building." Architects Norval White and Elliot Willensky wrote in 2000 that the building was "a highly conjectural reconstruction – not a restoration – based on 'typical' buildings of 'the period,' parts of remaining walls, and a lot of guesswork." Daniela Salazar at the website Untapped New York agrees, stating that the "reconstruction was extremely speculative, and resulted in an almost entirely new construction".

The building was declared a landmark in 1965 by the New York City Landmarks Preservation Commission, and the surrounding city block bounded by Pearl Street, Water Street, Broad Street and Coenties Slip was included on November 14, 1978. The National Park Service added the surrounding city block to the National Register of Historic Places (NRHP) on April 28, 1977, and the building was added to the NRHP on March 6, 2008.

Bombing

A bomb planted in the tavern exploded on January 24, 1975, killing four people and injuring more than 50 others. The Puerto Rican clandestine paramilitary organization "Fuerzas Armadas de Liberación Nacional Puertorriqueña" (Armed Forces of Puerto Rican National Liberation, or FALN), which had executed other bomb incidents in New York in the 1970s, claimed responsibility. No one had been prosecuted for the bombing as of 2022.

Among the victims who died was a young banker, Frank Connor (33), who had worked his way up over 15 years from clerk to assistant vice president at Morgan Guaranty Trust. Connor left behind his wife and two sons. A second New York worker was Harold H. Sherburne (66), whose career on Wall Street spanned four decades. Two executives, James Gezork (32), of Wilmington, Delaware, and Alejandro Berger (28), who worked for a Philadelphia-based chemical company, had traveled to New York for business meetings. Sherburne, Connor, and Berger died at the scene; Gezork died later at the hospital.

In a note police found in a phone booth nearby, the FALN wrote, "we … take full responsibility for the especially detornated (sic) bomb that exploded today at Fraunces Tavern, with reactionary corporate executives inside." The note claimed the bomb — roughly 10 pounds of dynamite that had been crammed into an attaché case and slipped into the tavern's entrance hallway — was retaliation for the "CIA ordered bomb" that killed three and injured 11 in a restaurant in Mayagüez, Puerto Rico, two weeks earlier.

Recent uses

Since 1907, the Fraunces Tavern Museum on the second and third floors has helped to interpret the Fraunces Tavern and the collection of artifacts that it holds.  The museum comprises nine galleries: The John Ward Dunsmore collection of painted scenes of the American revolution; the Elizabeth and Stanley DeForest Scott gallery of portraits of George Washington; the Long Room, the site of General George Washington's famous farewell dinner; the Clinton Room, a recreation of a federalist style dining room; the McEntee Gallery, depicting the history of the Sons of the Revolution; the Davis Education Center (Flag Gallery); and a number of other galleries and spaces used for periodic exhibitions. In 2014, for example, the museum exhibited 27 maps from the 1700 and 1800s, including a never before seen map from 1804 depicting the United States' postal routes.

The building served as the location of the General Society, Sons of the Revolution (a heritage organization similar to and competing with the "Sons of the American Revolution") office until 2002, when the General Society moved to Independence, Missouri. The Fraunces Tavern Museum maintains several galleries of art and artifacts about the Revolution including the McEntee "Sons of the Revolution" Gallery that displays much of the history of the Society. In 2011, the Fraunces Tavern Museum hosted a special naturalization ceremony for new citizens.

Gallery

See also
 List of the oldest restaurants in the United States
 List of National Historic Landmarks in New York City
 List of New York City Designated Landmarks in Manhattan below 14th Street
 National Register of Historic Places listings in Manhattan below 14th Street
 List of the oldest buildings in New York

References

External links

 
  (Fraunces Tavern Museum)
  (Fraunces Tavern Restaurant)

American Revolutionary War museums in New York (state)
Buildings and structures completed in 1907
Buildings and structures on the National Register of Historic Places in Manhattan
Drinking establishments in Manhattan
Financial District, Manhattan
History museums in New York City
History of New York City
Museums in Manhattan
New York (state) in the American Revolution
Restaurants in Manhattan
Historic districts on the National Register of Historic Places in New York (state)
Taverns in the American Revolution
American Revolution on the National Register of Historic Places
Taverns on the National Register of Historic Places in New York (state)
New York City Designated Landmarks in Manhattan
Historic districts in Lower Manhattan
New York City designated historic districts